Emam Hasan-e Vasati (also Romanized as Emām Ḩasan-e Vasaţī) is a village in Nasrabad Rural District (Kermanshah Province), in the Central District of Qasr-e Shirin County, Kermanshah Province, Iran. At the 2006 census, its population was 63, in 23 families.

References 

Populated places in Qasr-e Shirin County